Malik Qasim Khan Khattak is a Pakistani politician hailing from Karak District belonging to Pakistan Tehreek-e-Insaf. He served as Adviser to the chief minister on prisons in the 10th Khyber Pakhtunkhwa Assembly.

He has also served as Deputy District Nazim, Karak prior to contesting for Provincial Assembly in 2008 on ticket of JUI-F.

Controversies and Scandals

Malik Qasim Khattak's 10-year tenure had been continuously blighted with corruption charges. It has been alleged that he has committed corruption worth billion of rupees from royalty funds in water supply schemes and is currently under investigation by NAB.

He is nicknamed by his opponents as Mulzim number 36 since he is on the 36th number in NAB KP list.

Political career
Khan in 2013 Pakistani general election elected as independent and later join Pakistan Tehreek-e-Insaf.

External links

References

Living people
Pashtun people
Khyber Pakhtunkhwa MPAs 2013–2018
People from Karak District
Pakistan Tehreek-e-Insaf MPAs (Khyber Pakhtunkhwa)
Year of birth missing (living people)